One Man's Experience, also known as One Man's Story, was a DuMont Television Network anthology TV show written and produced by Lawrence Menkin (1911-2000). The show aired Monday through Friday at 2:30pm ET from October 6, 1952, to April 10, 1953. The 15-minute show aired alongside another 15-minute Menkin show One Woman's Experience which aired at 2:45pm ET.

Some sources suggest that these episodes were also aired during the DuMont series Monodrama Theater which aired at 11pm ET from May 1952 until December 7, 1953.

Episode status
As with many DuMont series, no episodes are known to exist.

See also
List of programs broadcast by the DuMont Television Network
List of surviving DuMont Television Network broadcasts

References

Bibliography
David Weinstein, The Forgotten Network: DuMont and the Birth of American Television (Philadelphia: Temple University Press, 2004) 
Alex McNeil, Total Television, Fourth edition (New York: Penguin Books, 1980) 
Tim Brooks and Earle Marsh, The Complete Directory to Prime Time Network TV Shows, Third edition (New York: Ballantine Books, 1964)

External links
One Man's Experience at IMDB
CTVA entry
DuMont historical website

DuMont Television Network original programming
1952 American television series debuts
1953 American television series endings
Black-and-white American television shows
Lost television shows